Syvert Omundsen Eeg (21 August 1757 – 20 November 1838) was a Norwegian farmer and sea captain. He was a representative in the Norwegian Constitutional Assembly in 1814.

Eeg was born in Søgne in Vest-Agder, Norway. He worked as both a farmer and a shipmaster. He signed up as a seaman in Kristiansand in 1796. He sailed aboard the  Strandmaagen and the brig Anne Marie. Later, he was the skipper of the galleons Emanuel and Peter. He was held captive in England as a result of the British embargo of Norway during the Napoleonic wars.

In 1782, Eeg married Anne Salvesdatter (1757-1842). The couple lived on the farm Eeg (Gården Eik in Søgne). They were the parents of eight children, of whom only five survived childhood.

He was elected to the Norwegian Constituent Assembly in 1814, representing the constituency of Mandals Amt (now Vest-Agder). Together with his fellow representatives, Erich Haagensen Jaabech and Osmund Andersen Lømsland, during the negotiations at Eidsvoll, he supported the position of the Union Party (Unionspartiet).

References

External links
Representantene på Eidsvoll 1814 (Cappelen Damm AS)
 Men of Eidsvoll (eidsvollsmenn)
memorial for Eidsvollsmann Eeg

Related reading
Holme Jørn (2014) De kom fra alle kanter - Eidsvollsmennene og deres hus  (Oslo: Cappelen Damm) 

1757 births
1838 deaths
People from Søgne
Fathers of the Constitution of Norway
Vest-Agder politicians
Norwegian people of the Napoleonic Wars